Coelenterazine is a luciferin, a molecule that emits light after reaction with oxygen, found in many aquatic organisms across eight phyla. It is the substrate of many luciferases such as Renilla reniformis luciferase (Rluc), Gaussia luciferase (Gluc), and photoproteins, including aequorin, and obelin. All these proteins catalyze the oxidation of this substance, a reaction catalogued EC 1.13.12.5.

History
Coelenterazine was simultaneously isolated and characterized by two groups studying the luminescent organisms sea pansy (Renilla reniformis) and the cnidarian Aequorea victoria, respectively. Both groups independently discovered that the same compound was used in both luminescent systems. The molecule was named after the now-obsolete phylum coelenterata. Likewise, the two main metabolites – coelenteramide and coelenteramine – were named after their respective functional groups. While coelenterazine was first discovered in Aequorea victoria, it was later shown that they do not synthesize coelenterazine, but obtain it through their diet, largely from crustaceans and copepods.

Occurrence
Coelenterazine is widely found in marine organisms including:
radiolarians
ctenophores
cnidarians such as Aequorea victoria, Obelia geniculata and Renilla reniformis
squid such as Watasenia scintillans and Vampyroteuthis infernalis
shrimp such as Systellaspis debilis and Oplophorus gracilirostris
copepods such as Pleuromamma xiphias and Gaussia princeps
chaetognaths
fish including some Neoscopelidae and Myctophidae
echinoderms such as Amphiura filiformis

The compound has also been isolated from organisms that are not luminescent, such as the Atlantic herring and several shrimp species including Pandalus borealis and Pandalus platyuros.

Biosynthesis 
Biosynthesis of coelenterazine in Metridia starts from two molecules of tyrosine and one molecule of phenylalanine, and some researchers believe this comes in the form of a cyclized "Phe-Tyr-Tyr" (FYY) peptide.

Many members of the genus Metridia also produce luciferases that use this compound, some of which are secreted into extracellular space, an unusual property for luciferases.

Properties 
Coelenterazine can be crystallized into orange-yellow crystals. The molecule absorbs light in the ultraviolet and visible spectrum, with peak absorption at 435 nm in methanol, giving the molecule a yellow color. The molecule spontaneously oxidizes in aerobic conditions or in some organic solvents such as dimethylformamide and DMSO and is preferentially stored in methanol or with an inert gas.

Synthetic coelenterazine derivatives
To improve its biophysical properties, derivatives of coelenterazine have been synthesized by means of different procedures including multicomponent strategies.

See also
 Coelenteramide
 Coelenteramine
 Furimazine
 Vargulin

References

External links
Bioluminescence Page showing major luciferin types.

External links

Bioluminescence
Aminopyrazines
Imidazopyrazines
Lactams
Phenols
Luciferins